H. Frank Carey High School is a public high school located in Franklin Square, New York serving students in the seventh through twelfth grades from the towns of Franklin Square, Garden City South, Garden City, West Hempstead, and Elmont.

As of the 2014-15 school year, the school had an enrollment of 1,634 students and 98.2 classroom teachers (on an FTE basis), for a student–teacher ratio of 16.6:1. There were 110 students (6.7% of enrollment) eligible for free lunch and 30 (1.8% of students) eligible for reduced-cost lunch.

History
H. Frank Carey High School was constructed in 1956 in the Long Island town of Franklin Square.  The school was named after then Board of Education President, Harley Frank Carey. During the 1999-2000 academic year, H. Frank Carey High School was recognized as a National School of Excellence.

Athletics
The following sports are offered at Carey:

Baseball
Basketball
Cross country
Field hockey
Football
Lacrosse
Soccer
Softball
Swimming
Tennis
Track-winter and spring
Volleyball
Wrestling

Notable alumni
 Bruce Arena, coach of the United States men's national soccer team. 
 Richie Cannata, Musician
 Ira Flatow, radio personality
 Randy Gordon, NY State Boxing Commissioner, Author, Radio Personality 
 Michael J. Massimino, NASA astronaut 
 Mike Tucci, actor
 Al Trautwig, broadcaster

References

External links
School website
Sewanhaka School District
Biography of H. Frank Carey

Public high schools in New York (state)
Schools in Nassau County, New York
Public middle schools in New York (state)